Vangelis (29 March 1943–17 May 2022) was a Greek musician, composer, and producer. He began his music career in the 1960s with the Greek progressive rock band Aphrodite's Child and in the 1970s began composing electronic music. He gained wide mainstream popularity after composing soundtracks to film Chariots of Fire (1981) and Blade Runner (1982). His solo career discography consists of 23 studio albums, 26 compilation albums, 12 soundtrack albums, and roughly 29 singles. The majority of his film, documentary, theatre, and ballet & dance scores weren't released or officially released. He also collaborated with Jon Anderson and as a duo Jon and Vangelis released 4 studio albums, 2 compilations, and 13 singles, and with Irene Papas released two studio albums.

His solo studio album Heaven and Hell (1975) was his UK chart debut (#31), while Albedo 0.39 (1976) his first Top 20 album. His best selling studio albums are China (1979) certified Silver for selling over 60,000 copies by BPI, Voices (1995) selling almost 300,000 certified copies in Germany and Austria, and Mythodea (2001) certified Platinum in Greece and Silver in Portugal. His compilation albums also had good sales, with Themes (1989) selling over 445,000 copies, Portraits (So Long Ago, So Clear) (1996) selling over a million copies in Europe, and Odyssey: The Definitive Collection (2003) over 110,000 copies. His best selling soundtracks are Opéra sauvage (1979) which reached #42 in the Billboard 200 and stayed in the charts for 39 weeks, Chariots of Fire (1981) which topped the Billboard 200 for 4 weeks and sold 2 million copies worldwide, Blade Runner (1994) sold over 250,000 copies, 1492: Conquest of Paradise (1992) topped the charts in Europe and sold 3 million copies worldwide, and Alexander (2004) certified Platinum in Hungary.

His solo single "Chariots of Fire" in 1982 topped the Billboard Hot 100, "Conquest of Paradise" (1992) topped the charts in Europe and sold over 1.6 million copies, and "Anthem" theme music for 2002 FIFA World Cup reached Top 5 in Japan and was certified Platinum by RIAJ.

Studio albums

Unofficial albums
Strictly not bootleg recordings as they appeared on a label, but they were released without Vangelis' permission and were later withdrawn from the market.
 (1978) Hypothesis
 (1978) The Dragon

Soundtracks
 (1970) Sex-Power - LP of the film by Henry Chapier (France)
 (1973) L'Apocalypse des animaux
 (1975) Entends-tu les chiens aboyer?; re-issued as Ignacio (1977)
 (1976) La Fête sauvage
 (1979) Opéra sauvage
 (1981) Chariots of Fire
 (1983) Antarctica
 (1992) 1492: Conquest of Paradise
 (1994) Blade Runner
 (2004) Alexander
 (2007) Blade Runner Trilogy. 25th Anniversary; 3-CD set featuring the remastered 1994 release, previously unreleased music from the film, and new music inspired by the film
 (2007) El Greco - Original Motion Picture Soundtrack (not to be confused with the 1998 album El Greco)
 (2008) Świadectwo - muzyka filmowa - for the Polish-Italian film Świadectwo by Paweł Pitera
Vangelis - Part 1: "Sanctus" (4:34), "In Aeternitatem" (1:58), "Humanum Est" (3:08); all other tracks by Robert Janson

Limited release albums
 (1984) Silent Portraits - LP album in a book of portraits - print run: 600
 (1995) Foros Timis Ston Greco - CD album included in a book about Greek painter El Greco - print run: 3,000; later expanded and put in general release as El Greco (1998)
 (1998) Microneurosurgery with video tapes  - 3 VHS included in a book of Microneurosurgery by Doctor Stergios Tegos

Collaboration albums
 (1968) 1965-1968 - Vangelis & The Forminx
 (1974) E tu... - Claudio Baglioni
 (1976) Phos - Socrates
 (1977) Chinese Restaurant - Krisma (Chrisma)
 (1977) The Demis Roussos Magic - Demis Roussos
 (1979) Odes - Irene Papas
 (1979) Hibernation - Krisma (Chrisma)
 (1980) Short Stories - Jon and Vangelis
 (1981) The Friends of Mr Cairo - Jon and Vangelis
 (1981) Ich Hab' Keine Angst (German lyrics) / Moi, je n'ai pas peur (French lyrics) - Milva
 (1983) Private Collection - Jon and Vangelis
 (1984) Reflection - Demis Roussos
 (1984) The Velocity of Love - Suzanne Ciani
 (1986) Rapsodies - Irene Papas
 (1986) Geheimnisse (German lyrics) / Tra Due Sogni  (Italian lyrics) - Milva
 (1991) Page of Life (U.S. and European versions) - Jon and Vangelis
 (1996) A Separate Affair - Neuronium 
 (1998) Another Page of Life - Jon and Vangelis

Compilation albums
 (1978) The Best of Vangelis
 (1981) Greatest Hits
 (1982) To the Unknown Man Vol. 1
 (1982) To the Unknown Man Vol. 2
 (1984) The Best of Jon and Vangelis - Jon and Vangelis
 (1989) Themes
 (1991) Greatest Hits (Europe 2xCD, Dutch 1xCD)
 (1992) Best of Vangelis (Spain)
 (1994) Chronicles - Jon and Vangelis
 (1994) Best Selection (Japan)
 (1994) The Collection
 (1995) Themes II (France)
 (1995) Space Themes (Italy)
 (1995) Best in Space (UK, Germany)
 (1995) Mundo Magico de Vangelis
 (1996) Gift... (UK)
 (1996) Portraits (So Long Ago, So Clear)
 (1997) The Best of Vangelis
 (1999) Reprise 1990-1999
 (2002) Cosmos (Belgium)
 (2002) The Best of Vangelis
 (2003) The Best of Vangelis (Belgium)
 (2003) Odyssey: The Definitive Collection
 (2012) The Collection
 (2013) Light & Shadow
 (2016) Delectus

Singles and EPs

Singles released under pseudonyms
 (1971) Astral Abuse/Who Killed, as Alpha Beta.
 (1974) Who/Sad Face, as Odyssey.
 (1975) "Bird of Love"/"The Pawn", as band Humanity (including Silver Koulouris, Michael Haubrich, F.R. David)
 (1978) Red Square, as Richard Broadbaker - Mama O'.

Other work

Film scores
 (1963) O adelfos mou... o trohonomos (aka My Brother, the Traffic Policeman) (1963) directed by Filippos Fylaktos (Greece)
 (1966) 5.000 psemmata (aka 5,000 lies) by Giorgos Konstantinou (Greece)
 (1971) Frenitis by Giannis Hristodoulou (Greece)
 (1972) Salut, Jerusalem by Henry Chapier (France)
 (1974) Amore by Henry Chapier (France)
 (1975) Crime and Passion (aka Ace Up My Sleeve) by Ivan Passer (UK, West Germany)
 (1978) De Mantel der Liefde by Adriaan Ditvoorst (Netherlands)
 (1980) Mater amatísima by José Antonio Salgot (Spain)
 (1980) Prkosna delta by Vesna Ljubić (Yugoslavia)
 (1982) Missing by Costa-Gavras (USA); main theme appears in compilations Themes, Odyssey: The Definitive Collection and The Collection
 (1984) The Bounty by Roger Donaldson (UK); "Opening Titles" and "Closing Titles" appear in compilation Themes, and "Opening Titles" in Odyssey: The Definitive Collection
 (1985) Wonders of Life by Ed Kong (USA, Hong Kong)
 (1988) Vampire in Venice by Augusto Caminito (Italy)
 (1989) Francesco by Liliana Cavani (Italy, West Germany); iTunes has the "Suite from the Motion Picture 'Francesco' (feat. Dominik Hauser)". An unofficial special limited edition CD was released by Andromeda Music in 2002 (AMO103).
 (1992) Bitter Moon by Roman Polanski (France, UK, USA); "Main Theme" appeared in compilations Reprise 1990–1999 and The Collection, while iTunes has the "Suite from the Motion Picture 'Bitter Moon' (feat. Dominik Hauser)"
 (1992) La Peste by Luis Puenzo (France/UK/Argentina); "Psalmus Ode" appears in compilation Reprise 1990-1999
 (1996) Kavafis (aka Cavafy) by Yannis Smaragdis (Greece); "Main Theme" appear in Odyssey - The Definitive Collection
 (2001) I Hope by  Marcello Daciano (US) 
 (2014) Twilight of Shadows by Mohammed Lakhdar-Hamina (Algeria)

Documentary scores
 (1974) Georges Mathieu ou la Fureur d'Être by Frédéric Rossif (France)
 (1975) Georges Braque ou le Temps Différent by Frédéric Rossif (France)
 (1980) Death of a Princess by Antony Thomas (UK)
 (1981) Pablo Picasso, Peintre by Frédéric Rossif (France)
 (1984) Sauvage et Beau by Frédéric Rossif (France); "Sauvage et Beau" appear in Sauvage et Beau EP (1986) and compilation Portraits (So Long Ago, So Clear).
 (1986) Carl Sagan's Cosmos (USA)
 (1989) De Nuremberg à Nuremberg by Frédéric Rossif (France)
 (1990) Mouseio Goulandri Fysikis Istorias by Giorgos Kolozis (Greece)
 (1991) Viaggio in Italia by Gabriella Rosaleva (Italy)
 (1992) Cousteau's Rediscovery of the World II by Jacques Cousteau (France)
 episodes  "Indonésie I: Les Vergers de l'Enfer" and "Indonésie II: Sumatra"
 (1998) Microneurosurgery with videotapes: Spinal Space-Occupying Lesions by Dr. Stergios Tegos (Greece); medical publication in 3 videotapes, with nearly 12 hours of music
 (2011) Rupture: A Matter of Life OR Death by Hugh Hudson (UK)
 (2012) Trashed by Candida Brady (UK)
 (2017) Cousteau Divers Mini 5: Boiling Ocean by Pierre-Yves Cousteau (France)
 (2022) Nuclear by Oliver Stone (USA)
 (2023) BEYOND by André Kuipers (Netherlands)

Theatre music
 (1983) Elektra (Greece)
 (1992) Medea (Spain)
 (1997) IAAF - World Athletics with Montserrat Caballé (Athens) (Greece);
 (2001) Las Troyanas (Spain)
 (2002) A Vihar (The Tempest) (Hungary)
 (2003) Le Troiane Ed Ecuba (Italy)
 (2005) Antigone (Italy)
 (2011) A message of hope  with Angela Gheorghiu & Roberto Alagna (Doha) (Qatar)
 (2012) Chariots Of Fire: The Play (UK)

Ballet & dance music
 (1983) R.B. Sque (UK)
 (1985) Frankenstein - Modern Prometheus (UK, Netherlands)
 (1986) The Beauty and the Beast (UK)
 (2013) The Beauty and the Beast (Russia)
 (2019) The Thread (UK)

Notes

References

External Links
 
 

Discographies of Greek artists
Vangelis albums
Vangelis songs
Electronic music discographies
Classical music discographies
Rock music discographies
Pop music discographies